The discography of Austin Mahone, an American singer-songwriter, consists of one studio album, two mixtapes, five extended plays, eighteen singles, twenty six promotional singles, and twenty-two music videos. Mahone independently released his debut single, "11:11" to iTunes on February 14, 2012.  On May 29, 2013, he released his debut EP, Extended Play, in Japan only. On June 5, 2012, Mahone independently released his second single, "Say Somethin", his first release under the management of Chase Entertainment. On August 28, 2012, Mahone announced that he had been signed to Chase/Universal Republic Records.

"Mmm Yeah" was released as the lead single from Mahone's second EP, titled The Secret, released on January 26, 2014. The Secret was released on May 27, 2014. Mahone later released music videos for promotional singles "All I Ever Need", "Shadow" and "Secret", though no further official singles were released from the EP. Over the course of 2014 and 2015, he continued to independently release new music for his fans. Five new songs titled "Say My Name", "Places", "Waiting for This Love", "Someone Like You" and "Torture" were released for free download through his official SoundCloud page.

On July 1, 2015, Mahone released the lead single from his debut studio album, "Dirty Work".

As of June 2014, Mahone has sold a total of 2.3 million digital songs.

Mahone's second studio album is due for release in 2023. As of March 2023, two singles have preceded the album's release: "No Limits" (with Fueled by 808 and Kid Rock featuring Jimmie Allen) and "Withdrawal".

Albums

Studio albums

Mixtapes

Extended plays

Singles

As lead artist

As a featured artist

Promotional singles

Other appearances

Music videos

Footnotes

References

Pop music discographies
Discographies of American artists